Dawid Szulczek (born 26 January 1990) is a Polish football manager and former player who manages Ekstraklasa club Warta Poznań.

Managerial career
After retiring as a player in 2013, Szulczek started his coaching career as an assistant at Górnik Wesoła. Before the 2014–15 season, he joined Rozwój Katowice and held the role of assistant coach until 2017. After head coach Tadeusz Krawiec's dismissal before the last matchday of 17–18 season, he took on the position of interim coach and led Rozwój to a 0–1 II liga win against Gryf Wejherowo on 3 June 2017.

On 13 June 2017, Szulczek was recruited by Artur Skowronek and joined his staff at Wigry Suwałki as an assistant coach. He would follow Skowronek and work in a similar role at Stal Mielec and Wisła Kraków.

Wigry Suwałki
On 21 July 2020, he was appointed as manager of II liga team Wigry Suwałki. Wigry finished the 2020–21 campaign in 4th, with 18 wins, 10 draws and 8 losses in 36 games. They would subsequently crash out of I liga promotion play-offs in the first round after losing to KKS 1925 Kalisz.

He obtained the UEFA Pro license in September 2020, becoming the youngest holder of such certification in Poland at the time.

Warta Poznań
On 8 November 2021, his contract was bought out by Ekstraklasa side Warta Poznań and he signed until the end of the season, with a two-year extension option. On 1 April 2022, his contract was extended until June 2024.

Managerial statistics

References

1990 births
Living people
People from Świętochłowice
Polish footballers
Association football midfielders
Polish football managers
Ekstraklasa managers
II liga managers
Wigry Suwałki managers
Warta Poznań managers